Presidential elections were held in Algeria on 7 February 1979, following the death of incumbent Houari Boumediene in December 1978. His replacement as National Liberation Front leader, Chadli Bendjedid, was elected unopposed with 99.4% of the vote, based on a 99% turnout.

Results

References

Algeria
1979 in Algeria
Presidential elections in Algeria
One-party elections
Single-candidate elections